{{DISPLAYTITLE:C24H39NO7}}
The molecular formula C24H39NO7 (molar mass: 453.576 g/mol, exact mass: 453.2727 u) may refer to:

 Delcosine
 Gigactonine

Molecular formulas